Oleg Mykhaylov (born 1 May 1968) is a Ukrainian sport shooter. He competed in rifle shooting events at the Summer Olympics in 1996 and 2000.

Olympic results

References

1968 births
Living people
ISSF rifle shooters
Ukrainian male sport shooters
Olympic shooters of Ukraine
Shooters at the 1996 Summer Olympics
Shooters at the 2000 Summer Olympics